Arcis-sur-Aube (literally Arcis on Aube) is a commune in the Aube department in the Grand Est region of north-central France.

The inhabitants of the commune are known as Arcisiens or Arcisiennes.

The commune has been awarded "three flowers" by the National Council of Towns and Villages in Bloom in the Competition of cities and villages in Bloom.

Geography
Arcis-sur-Aube is located some 27 km north of Troyes and 40 km east of Romilly-sur-Seine. Access to the commune is by the D441 road from Villette-sur-Aube in the west passing through the commune and the town and continuing to Vaupoisson. The D677 also comes from Mailly-le-Camp in the north intersecting the D441 in the town and continuing south to Voué. The D31 also goes south-west from the town to Les Grandes-Chapelles. The D10 road comes from Allibaudières in the north-west and passes through the north-west of the commune joining the D441 west of the town. A railway passes through the west of the commune from north to south with a station west of the town. The Aube river marks the northern boundary of the town flowing west but the commune covers both left and right banks of the river. The D677 passes over the river on a bridge.

The right bank and a small portion of the left bank of the Aube consists of forest and farmland. The urban area of the town extends south from the left bank and occupies about a quarter of the land area. The south of the commune is entirely farmland.

Transport Access
Road access
By motorway: the A26 autoroute, exit No. 21 (Valley of Dawn).
By county roads:
D677 between Troyes and Mailly-le-Camp.
D31 between Nozay and Arcis-sur-Aube.
D441 between Méry-sur-Seine and Molins-sur-Aube.
D10 between Allibaudières and Arcis-sur-Aube.
D56 between Ormes and Arcis-sur-Aube.

Public transport
Coach:
Regular route No. 7: Troyes (bus station) ⇒ ⇒ Arcis Mailly and vice versa. The stop is located in front of the hall (schedules available on the Procars website). Route 7 is operated by the company Procars Champagne and managed by the General Council of Aube.
Regular route No. 5: TransChampagneArdenne Troyes ⇒ Chalons-en-Champagne ⇒ Reims ⇒ Charleville-Mézières and vice versa. The stop is located at Rue de Chalons (schedules available on the Stdmarne website). Route 5 is operated by the Departmental Transportation Services of the Marne.
Train:
Troyes station, taxis available in the station square.
Air:
Aerodrome Troyes Barberey
Chalons Vatry Airport

History

Saint Victor was a hermit and confessor at Arcis-sur-Aube in the 6th century.
Around the same period a local coinage called Leudericus and Daovaldus was produced.
In 1546, François I authorized the construction of walls around the city.
Arcis has been the scene of the Battle of Arcis-sur-Aube, a bloody battle fought by Napoleon I on 1 March 1814 against the Austro-Russians: part of the city was burned. An erroneous claim has been made that Arcis-sur-Aube bares its name as a commemoration of the Cossacks from the Russian army a city in Ukraine (Artsyz) and a village in the southern Urals (Arsinski or Арсинский). In reality, the town already bore the name since medieval times, as witnessed by three sources, including The Chronicle of Alberic de Trois-Fontaines, which names Hilduin II as "comes de Arceis et de Ramerut" (count of Arcis and Ramerurpt). 
From 1790 to 1795 Arcis was the chief town of the arrondissement of Arcis-sur-Aube which was composed of 11 cantons and 89 communes.
During the creation of arrondissements in 1800 Arcis became the capital of one of them but this was abolished in 1926. The cantons of Arcis-sur-Aube and Ramerupt are attached to the Arrondissement of Troyes; the Canton of Méry-sur-Seine was attached to the Arrondissement of Nogent-sur-Seine, and the Canton of Chavanges was attached to the Arrondissement of Bar-sur-Aube. This was effective from 1801: 4 cantons and 93 communes.

Heraldry

Administration

List of Successive Mayors

Twinning

Arcis-sur-Aube has twinning associations with:
 Gomaringen (Germany) since 1976.

Population

Economy
Besides many big farms producing all sorts of cereals, the sugar industry has a big plant there: Cristal Union

Culture and heritage

Civil heritage
The commune has a number of buildings and structures that are registered as historical monuments:
The Savouré Factory at 47 rue des Anciens fossés (19th century)
The Town Hall at Place des Héros (formerly a Chateau) (18th century)
The former Chigot et cie Factory at 21 Rue Jean Jaurès (1908)
The former Jules Bourgeois Factory at 21 Rue Jean Jaurès (19th century)
The Gérard Fortier Factory at 44 Rue de Troyes (19th century)

Religious heritage

The Church of Saint-Étienne (16th century) is registered as an historical monument. It was bombed in June 1940 and then restored. It houses two pentagonal chapels and a flamboyant portal. The Church contains many items that are registered as historical objects:

A Statue: Virgin and child (14th century)
Stained glass windows (16th century)
2 Prie-dieu (19th century)
Ciboria (19th century)
A Paten (19th century)
A Chalice (18th century)
A Credence table (18th century)
The Furniture in the Church

Arcis-sur-Aube picture gallery

Notable people linked to the commune

Georges Jacques Danton, was born 26 October 1759 in Arcis-sur-Aube to a respectable though not wealthy family. He was given a good education, and he was launched in the career of an advocate at the Paris bar. He became a French revolutionary and died on the guillotine in Paris on 5 April 1794.
Pierre Arnauld de La Briffe (6 May 1772, Paris - 11 September 1839, Arcis-sur-Aube), Lord of Arcis-sur-Aube before the French Revolution, military man and French politician in the 19th century.
Hugues-Iéna Darcy (29 October 1807, Arcis-sur-Aube - 4 June 1880, Corcelles-les-Monts) high French official of the 19th century

In Literature
Honoré de Balzac made Arcis-sur-Aube part of his novel Le Député d'Arcis (The Member for Arcis), left unfinished at his death and completed by Charles Rabbou. Arcis-sur-Aube was also the place of action in Une ténébreuse affaire (A murky affair) written in 1844.

See also
Communes of the Aube department
Artsyz, a city in Odessa Oblast, Ukraine is named after Arcis-sur-Aube

References

External links
Arcis-sur-Aube official website 
Arcis-sur-Aube on the National Geographic Institute website 
Arcis-sur-Aube on Géoportail, National Geographic Institute (IGN) website 
Arcis-sur-Aube on the 1750 Cassini Map

Communes of Aube